Pexopsis is a genus of flies in the family Tachinidae.

Species
P. aprica (Meigen, 1824)
P. aurea Sun & Chao, 1993
P. buccalis Mesnil, 1951
P. capitata Mesnil, 1951
P. clauseni (Aldrich, 1932)
P. dongchuanensis Sun & Chao, 1993
P. flavipsis Sun & Chao, 1993
P. kyushuensis Shima, 1968
P. orientalis Sun & Chao, 1993
P. pollinis Sun & Chao, 1993
P. rasa Mesnil, 1970
P. shanghaiensis Sun & Chao, 1993
P. shanxiensis Sun & Chao, 1993
P. trichifacialis Sun & Chao, 1993
P. yakushimana Shima, 1968
P. zhangi Sun & Chao, 1993

References

Exoristinae
Diptera of Europe
Diptera of Asia
Tachinidae genera
Taxa named by Friedrich Moritz Brauer
Taxa named by Julius von Bergenstamm